Trial by Fire is an adventure for fantasy role-playing games published by Judges Guild in 1981.

Plot summary
Trial by Fire is an introductory scenario for 1st-level characters, a one-level dungeon beneath a fortress.

Trial by Fire is an introductory adventure for AD&D.  A group of adventurers goes down into an underground world of monsters, magic and treasure.  Included with each room description are pertinent rules from AD&D for handling the situation presented.

Publication history
Trial by Fire was written by Mike Wilson, and was published by Judges Guild in 1981 as a 32-page book.

TSR opted not to renew Judges Guild's license for D&D when it expired in September 1980. They managed to hold onto their AD&D license a little while longer, so adventures like The Illhiedrin Book (1981), Zienteck (1981), Trial by Fire (1981), and Rudy Kraft's Portals of Twilight (1981) would finish off that line.

Reception
J. David George reviewed the adventure in The Space Gamer No. 49. He called the adventure "classic D&D". George commented that "Perhaps the best part of this adventure is that the more obscure rules and monsters stats for each situation are found with the room descriptions, saving time for the DM.  In a few cases where the necessary rules are too long for inclusion, the DM is referred to a page in the appropriate rulebook." He continued: "There are a few omissions of rules and stats, but nothing a competent DM can't deal with.  The biggest problem with the adventure is the adventure itself.  Used as an introduction, it will give new players the impression that all AD&D consists of gilded holes, full of monsters waiting to be slain and lairs waiting to be looted.  The background for the adventure is sketchy; the rationale is weak.  Typical of bad D&D, big, predatory monsters live in rooms within a hundred feet of each other and more roam the halls in between." George concluded his review by saying "Trial by Fire would be a fair adventure for the first-time DM, as it allows easy access to the more obscure rules.  More experienced players and DMs are likely to be dissatisfied with the weak logic behind the scenario."

Reviews
 Different Worlds #19 (Feb., 1982)

References

Judges Guild fantasy role-playing game adventures
Role-playing game supplements introduced in 1981